All Stars is the second solo album by the Croatian guitarist Jurica Pađen, released through Croatia Records in December 2014. The album was recorded from July to October 2014 in ZG Zvuk Studio in Zagreb and contains 12 instrumental tracks featuring some of the most famous guitar players from the Croatian rock scene like Massimo Savić, Branimir Štulić, Husein Hasanefendić, Zele Lipovača, Neno Belan, Vedran Božić and Nikša Bratoš. The album release was followed by video for "Love Is Blue / Al Dente", featuring Drugi Način guitarist Mario Domazet. The second single released was "Prijateljska vatra" in June 2015, featuring Branimir Štulić. The album debuted at #30 and topped at #10 on the official Croatian Top 40 domestic albums selling chart and at #11 on the combined domestic/foreign chart. The album was nominated in two categories on 22nd Porin Music Award in 2015 and was awarded for "Instrumental Album of the Year (outside Classical and Jazz music)".

Track listing
All music written by Jurica Pađen, except track 11 by André Popp.

Charts

Personnel 
Organic band
Jurica Pađen – Electric guitars, Acoustic guitars, twelve-string guitars, ukulele
Tomislav Šojat – Bass in tracks 1, 2, 4, 5 and 9
Damir Medić – Drums, cajon, percussions
Remo Cartagine – Bass in tracks 3, 7, 8 and 10
Mario Domazet – Charango, acoustic guitars, resonator guitars
Hrvoje Prskalo – Acoustic guitars, percussions

Guest musicians
Branimir Štulić – Electric guitars in track 2
Husein Hasanefendić – Electric guitars in track 3
Massimo Savić – Electric guitars in tracks 1 and 5
Neno Belan – Electric guitars in track 5
Nikša Bratoš – Electric guitars, acoustic guitars in track 7
Vedran Božić – Electric guitars and bass in track 6
Zele Lipovača – Electric guitars in track 4

Artwork
Ljubo Zdjelarević – Photography and design

Production
Jurica Pađen – Producer
Hrvoje Prskalo – Producer, Audio engineer

References

External links 
 Official Youtube channel

Jurica Pađen albums
2014 albums
Croatia Records albums